Pimelodella altipinnis is a species of three-barbeled catfish of the family Heptapteridae. It is endemic to the Essequibo River basin in Guyana (South America).

References

Bockmann, F.A. and G.M. Guazzelli, 2003. Heptapteridae (Heptapterids). p. 406-431. In R.E. Reis, S.O. Kullander and C.J. Ferraris, Jr. (eds.) Checklist of the Freshwater Fishes of South and Central America. Porto Alegre: EDIPUCRS, Brasil

altipinnis
Catfish of South America
Fish of Guyana
Endemic fauna of Guyana
Taxa named by Franz Steindachner
Fish described in 1864